The Zwegabin Mountain slender gecko (Hemiphyllodactylus zwegabinensis) is a species of gecko. It is endemic to Myanmar.

References

Hemiphyllodactylus
Reptiles described in 2020
Reptiles of Myanmar
Endemic fauna of Myanmar
Taxa named by Larry Lee Grismer
Taxa named by Perry L. Wood
Taxa named by Evan Quah
Taxa named by Myint Kyaw Thura
Taxa named by Jamie R. Oaks
Taxa named by Aung Lin